Beach ox-eye may refer to the following plant species:

Borrichia frutescens
Melanthera biflora